Blush is a surname. Notable people with the surname include:

 Brian Blush, American musician, guitarist for The Refreshments
 Heather Blush, Canadian jazz and blues singer
 Steven Blush, American author, publisher and promoter

Fictional characters:
 Fatima Blush, a character in the 1983 James Bond film Never Say Never Again